Trịnh Thị Bích Như (born 15 October 1985) is a Vietnamese female Paralympic swimmer.

In the 2012 Summer Paralympics in London she competed in the Women's 100m Breaststroke - SB5.

References 

Swimmers at the 2012 Summer Paralympics
Vietnamese female breaststroke swimmers
Vietnamese female butterfly swimmers
Vietnamese female freestyle swimmers
1985 births
Living people
Paralympic competitors for Vietnam
21st-century Vietnamese women
S6-classified Paralympic swimmers
Medalists at the 2018 Asian Para Games